Kunlun Shan is the lead ship of China's Type 071 amphibious transport dock Yuzhao class. The ship was laid down in the Hudong-Zhonghua Shipbuilding in Shanghai in June 2006 and was launched on 21 December 2006. After finishing trials the ship was commissioned to the South Sea Fleet on 30 November 2007, at Zhanjiang Naval Base. Its estimated production cost is USD300 million.

The ship carries the name of the Kunlun Mountains.

Use
On 9 March 2014, the ship was deployed in the search for the missing Malaysia Airlines Flight 370.

In September 2016, the ship took part in combined naval exercises with the Russians off Guangdong.

In 2019, the ship took part in Chinese Navy Taskforce anti-piracy operations in the Gulf of Aden and had a stopover in Sydney, Australia in June on return trip.

References 

 LAN Type 071 Landing Platform Dock by Chris King

Type 071 amphibious transport docks
2006 ships
Vessels involved in the search for Malaysia Airlines Flight 370